This is a disambiguation page for the biological term. For the 2018 horror movie, see Antrum (film)

In biology, antrum is a general term for a cavity or chamber, which may have specific meaning in reference to certain organs or sites in the body.

In vertebrates, it may refer specifically to:

 Antrum follicularum, the cavity in the epithelium that envelops the oocyte
 Mastoid antrum, a cavity between the middle ear and temporal bone in the skull
 Stomach antrum, either
 Pyloric antrum, the lower portion of the stomach. This is what is usually referred to as "antrum" in stomach-related topics
 or Antrum cardiacum, a dilation that occurs in the esophagus near the stomach (forestomach)
 Maxillary antrum or antrum of Highmore, the maxillary sinus, a cavity in the maxilla and the largest of the paranasal sinuses

In invertebrates, it may refer specifically to:

 Antrum of female lepidoptera genitalia

Anatomy